The Nigerian National Assembly delegation from Enugu State comprises three Senators and six Representatives.

6th Assembly (2007–2011)

The 6th National Assembly (2007–2011) was inaugurated on 5 June 2007.
The People's Democratic Party (PDP) won all the Senate and House seats.

Senators representing Enugu State in the 6th Assembly were:

Representatives in the 6th Assembly were:

8th National Assembly (2015 till 2019) 
Senators representing Enugu State in the 8th Assembly are

9th National Assembly (2019 till date) 
Senators representing Enugu State in the 9th Assembly are:[3]

See also
Senate of Nigeria
Nigerian National Assembly

References

National Assembly
National Assembly (Nigeria) delegations by state